Clinton presidential campaign may refer to: 

 Bill Clinton 1992 presidential campaign, successful campaign
 Bill Clinton presidential reelection campaign, successful  campaign in 1996
 Hillary Clinton 2008 presidential campaign, failed campaign
 Hillary Clinton 2016 presidential campaign, failed campaign